Baron Gifford, of St Leonard's in the County of Devon, is a title in the Peerage of the United Kingdom. It was created on 30 January 1824 for the lawyer Sir Robert Gifford, who later served as Master of the Rolls. His grandson, the third Baron, was a soldier and colonial administrator and was awarded the Victoria Cross in 1874. On his death the title passed to his younger brother, the fourth Baron, and then to their nephew, the fifth Baron.  the title is held by the latter's son, the sixth Baron, who succeeded in 1961. He is a barrister.

The Hon. Maurice Gifford, fourth son of the second Baron, was a soldier.

The family surname and the title of the barony are pronounced "Jifford".

Barons Gifford (1824)
Robert Gifford, 1st Baron Gifford (1779–1826)
Robert Francis Gifford, 2nd Baron Gifford (1817–1872)
Edric Frederick Gifford, 3rd Baron Gifford (1849–1911)
Edgar Berkeley Gifford, 4th Baron Gifford (1857–1937)
Charles Maurice Elton Gifford, 5th Baron Gifford (1899–1961)
Anthony Maurice Gifford, 6th Baron Gifford (b. 1940)

The heir apparent is the present holder's son, the Hon. Thomas Adam Gifford (b. 1967). There are no other heirs to the barony.

Male-line family tree

Coat of arms

Notes

References

Baronies in the Peerage of the United Kingdom
Noble titles created in 1824
Noble titles created for UK MPs